Stinking Creek may refer to:

Streams
Stinking Creek (Kentucky)
Stinking Creek (Pomme de Terre River), a stream in Missouri
Stinking Creek (Haw River tributary), a stream in Chatham County, North Carolina
Stinking Creek, a tributary to Lake Chickasha in Oklahoma
Stinking Creek (Campbell County, Tennessee)

Communities
Stinking Creek, Tennessee

See also
Stinking River
Stink Creek